2014 Fiesta Bowl may refer to:

 2014 Fiesta Bowl (January), played as part of the 2013–14 college football bowl season between the UCF Knights and the Baylor Bears
 2014 Fiesta Bowl (December), played as part of the 2014–15 college football bowl season between the Boise State Broncos and the Arizona Wildcats